Colonel Mohamed Sudqi Ayyash (1925-2000) was a Bahraini police band leader who wrote the words for the Bahraini national anthem, Bahrainona, used from Bahrain's independence from the United Kingdom in 1971 until 2002, when they were changed as a result of the country becoming an emirate.

Lyrics by Mohammed Sudqi Ayyash

References

National anthem writers
Bahraini musicians
1925 births
2000 deaths